The Beneficial Microbes Museum and Tourism Factory (BMM) is a museum in Yilan City, Yilan County, Taiwan. The museum is the first microorganism museum in Taiwan.

Name
The name of the museum reflects its literal meaning of "bacteria treasure" in Taiwanese and its homonym of "very precious" in Taiwanese.

Objective
The museum aims to help providing a further understanding about bacteria, so that instead of knowing only about harmful bacteria in nature, the general public will be able to recognize some of the beneficial microbes for human life and then relieve their fears or phobias.

History
In January 2011, the Bionin Biotechnology Inc. called for a group of experts in microorganism from Taiwan and the United States to found the Bionin Biotechnology Tourism Factory and Beneficial Microbes Museum.

Transportation
The museum is accessible by bus from Yilan railway station of the Taiwan Railways Administration.

See also
 List of museums in Taiwan

References

External links
 

2011 establishments in Taiwan
Microorganisms and humans
Museums established in 2011
Museums in Yilan County, Taiwan
Natural history museums in Taiwan